Majitha is a town and a municipal council in Amritsar district in the Indian state of Punjab. The 2011 Census of India recorded 14,503 people resident in the town.

The renowned Majithia family of Sardars of the Sher-Gill Jat clan trace their origins to Majithia and adopted the name of the town as their surname.

Etymology 
The original name of the town, Madho-Jetha, became contracted into Majitha overtime.

History 
The town was founded by a man named Madho, a Jat of the Gill clan. Since he was the eldest son of his father, the town was named 'Madho-Jetha' (jetha means 'elder' or 'firstborn' in Punjabi). Madho is believed to be an ancestor of the Majithia family.

Politics 
The city is part of the Majitha Assembly Constituency.

References

Cities and towns in Amritsar district